White House Gender Policy Council is a department within the White House Office in the Biden administration. The council was initially co-chaired by Jennifer Klein and Julissa Reynoso Pantaleón. In May 2022, Reynoso stepped away from the role following her confirmation as Ambassador to Spain, and the office is currently led by Klein as director.

See also 

 White House Council on Women and Girls

References 

White House Office